I Was Lorena Bobitt is a 2020 Canadian-American dramatic television film, directed by Danishka Esterhazy. The film stars Luke Humphrey and Dani Montalvo as John and Lorena Bobbitt, the Virginia couple whose troubled marriage became international news in 1993 when Lorena cut off her husband's penis with a knife.

Although primarily acted as a dramatic story, the film also includes some narration by Lorena Bobbitt Gallo herself. Its cast also included Niamh Wilson, Patrice Goodman, Richard Clarkin and Dan Lett.

The film premiered May 25, 2020 on Lifetime. Its broadcast was accompanied by a special public service announcement promoting services to combat domestic violence, starring Humphrey, Montalvo and Gallo.

Awards

References

External links

2020 films
2020 television films
Canadian drama television films
English-language Canadian films
Lifetime (TV network) films
Gemini and Canadian Screen Award for Best Television Film or Miniseries winners
American drama television films
2020s Canadian films
2020s American films